Binsted is a village and large civil parish in East Hampshire, England. The parish is one of the largest in northern Hampshire and covers almost . It contains two villages, Bucks Horn Oak and Holt Pound, as well as two hamlets, Wyck and Wheatley. The parish also covers the entirety of the Alice Holt Forest, a royal forest situated near the border with Surrey. According to the 2011 census, the parish had a population of 1,817 people.

The village was first mentioned as being part of the Hundred of Netham at the time of the Domesday Survey in 1086. The history of Binsted from the 11th to 19th centuries is not documented, owing to its isolation and non-involvement in controversial activity. The parish has 58 Grade II listed buildings, and one Grade I building – the Church of the Holy Cross.

History
At the time of the Domesday Survey, Binsted was listed as part of the Hundred of Netham as well as the Manor of Alton Westbrook. The village was referred to as "Benested", which means "holding of land". Over the years there have been different variations on the spelling of the name, including Bensted, Benested and Boonsted (11th century), Bensted (14th century), and Bennsted (17th century). The name most likely has its origin from the Saxon word "bin", meaning "heap". Before the Norman Conquest, the village was known as "Binsted Popham" and was held by Egbert of Wessex. 

The history of Binsted from the 11th century to the early 19th century is not documented. A likely explanation is that the village remained a "simple agricultural community" and was not involved in any controversial activity, due to its isolation. However, the Alice Holt Forest was an important supplier of timber from the 12th and 18th centuries, and the forest was claimed to have 13,000 trees "fit for ship building" in the early 17th century. 

Binsted was recorded in the Imperial Gazetteer of England and Wales by John Marius Wilson in 1870. Five years later a school was built on land belonging to the Wickham Estate from stones brought from a pit near Semaphore House.

Geography and demographics
It also includes the entirety of the Alice Holt Forest. The landscape is dominated by farms and woodland such as Binsted Farm, Wheatley Copse and Sparkfield Wood. The parish contains two hamlets; Wyck and Wheatley, and two villages; Bucks Horn Oak and Holt Pound. The River Wey forms the parish's northern boundary. According to the 2011 census, the parish of Binsted had a population of 1,817 people. In addition, there are 711 households in the parish with an average size of 2.56 people.

Binsted Church
The Church of the Holy Cross is a Grade I listed building. 
The existing parish church started construction in about 1140 AD.  It has early 13th and 15th century additions, as well as a substantial restoration in 1863. The building itself consists of stone walls, a tiled roof, and a stone slated porch. The oldest part is the chancel, which dates from the 12th century with 15th century extensions. The north chapel was altered in 1331, and in its churchyard is the grave of famed Second World War Field Marshal Bernard Montgomery (Viscount Montgomery of Alamein), who latterly lived in the parish at Isington Mill. The churchyard also contains the Commonwealth war graves of six British Army soldiers of World War I (all in the north west corner) and a Royal Air Force airman of World War II (in south west corner).

Notable landmarks
The parish contains a total of 58 Grade II listed buildings, including a Grade II* listed barn. Other listed buildings include Barnfield House – three houses which were once separated all dating from 1550 with 20th century restorations. The house itself has a timber frame with a tiled roof, including a late medieval hall. Mill Court, another Grade II listed building, is a large house dating from the early 19th century with a low pitched roof and yellow brickwork, and became a listed building on 15 August 1985.

Telegraph House was built on the hill NE of the village by the Admiralty in 1825 as a semaphore relay station close to the railway line linking London with Portsmouth, one of a number of relay stations. It is now a private residence.

Climate
Due to its location in south central England and its proximity to the sea, the average maximum temperature in January is 7.2 °C (45 °F) with the average minimum being 1.6 °C (35 °F). The average maximum temperature in July is 21.9 °C (71 °F), with the average minimum being 12.5 °C (55 °F). The hamlet gets around 755 millimetres (29.7 in) of rain a year, with a minimum of 1 mm (0.04 in) of rain reported on 103 days a year.

References
Citations

Notes

External links

 The History of the Church of the Holy Cross, Binsted
 Church of the Holy Cross, Binsted
 Stained Glass Windows at Holy Cross, Binsted, Hampshire

Villages in Hampshire